WVRC (1400 kHz) is an AM radio station broadcasting a southern gospel format. Licensed to Spencer, West Virginia, United States, it serves the  area. The station is currently owned by Andrew Miller, through licensee ASM Communications Inc.

External links

Southern Gospel radio stations in the United States
VRC